Un gaffeur sachant gaffer, written and drawn by Franquin, is the sixth album of the original Gaston Lagaffe series.  The 59 strips of this album were previously published in Spirou magazine.

Story
In this album, Léon Prunelle replace definitively and officially Fantasio who left the office to make reports. Freddy les-doigts-de-fées appears for the first time.

Background

References

 Gaston Lagaffe classic series on the official website
 Publication in Spirou on bdoubliées.com.

External links
Official website 

1968 graphic novels
Comics by André Franquin